Karimabad-e Sofla (also Romanized as Karīmābād-e Soflá; also known as Karīmābād-e Farzān and Karīmābād-e Pā’īn) is a village in Hoseynabad Rural District, Esmaili District, Anbarabad County, Kerman Province, Iran. At the 2006 census, its population was 1,123, in 236 families.

References 

Populated places in Anbarabad County